Alexander Escobar Gañán (born 8 February 1965), also known as Álex Escobar, is a retired Colombian footballer who played as a midfielder.

Escobar is highly regarded in América de Cali and LDU de Quito, as well as in the Colombia national team. With the first he won six Primera A titles, and with the second won four Serie A titles. He is also the player with most appearances in América de Cali.

Club career

Escobar was born in Cali on 8 February 1965. His father was Hernán Escobar Echeverry, a retired defender that played in América de Cali, Atlético Nacional and Independiente Medellín. Escobar scored 14 goals in 83 matches in the Copa Libertadores from 1984 to 2004, making him the 9th player with most appearances in the tournament on 27 March 2004.

América de Cali
Escobar was part of the youth team of América de Cali, and played for the national football team of Valle del Cauca on 1982 and 1983. He debuted for América on 1983, and played for the team until 1997, when was transferred to LDU de Quito. Escobar is the player with most appearances for América, with 505 games played, and with 75 goals scored.

International career
Escobar made his international debut on 3 November 1985 (at just 20 years old), while playing for América de Cali, in the match against Paraguay for the 1986 FIFA World Cup qualifying. The match ended with a 2–1 win, but Colombia (who had lost the previous game 4–0) was eliminated.

Two years later he was part of the national squad for the 1987 Copa América, in which Colombia finished third. Escobar only played one match, the 2–1 win against the host Argentina in the third-place match.

Escobar scored his only goal for the national team in the 74th minute of the 2–2 draw against South Korea on 26 February 1994 in a friendly match.

Career statistics

Club
This table is incomplete, thus some stats and totals could be incorrect.

International

International appearances

International goals

|}

Honours

Player
América de Cali
Primera A (6): 1983, 1984, 1985, 1986, 1990, 1992
Runner-up (3): 1987, 1991, 1995
Copa Libertadores
Runner-up (4): 1985, 1986, 1987, 1996

Atlético Mineiro
Copa Master de CONMEBOL
Runner-up (1): 1996

LDU Quito
Serie A (4): 1998, 1999, 2003, 2005 Apertura

Assistant coach
América de Cali
Primera A (1): 2008 Finalización
Runner-up (1): 2008 Apertura

Juan Aurich
Torneo Descentralizado (1): 2011

Junior
Primera A (1): 2010 Apertura

References

External links
 
 

1965 births
Living people
Colombian footballers
Colombia international footballers
Colombian expatriate footballers
Association football midfielders
Categoría Primera A players
Ecuadorian Serie A players
Campeonato Brasileiro Série A players
América de Cali footballers
Atlético Minero footballers
L.D.U. Quito footballers
Millonarios F.C. players
Deportivo Pereira footballers
Expatriate footballers in Brazil
Expatriate footballers in Ecuador
1987 Copa América players
Footballers from Cali